Reginald Leon "Reggie" Rusk (born October 19, 1972, in Galveston, Texas) is a former professional American football cornerback in the National Football League. He played six seasons for the Tampa Bay Buccaneers (1996–1997), the Seattle Seahawks (1997–1998), and the San Diego Chargers (1999–2000).

1972 births
Living people
Sportspeople from Galveston, Texas
Players of American football from Texas
American football cornerbacks
Kentucky Wildcats football players
Tampa Bay Buccaneers players
Seattle Seahawks players
San Diego Chargers players